The Brewery Arts Complex (also known as the Brewery Art Colony) in Los Angeles has been called the largest live-and-work artists colony in the world. The 16-acre compound sits on twenty-one former warehouses and includes a former Edison power plant chimney dating to 1903, work studios, living lofts, restaurants and galleries. The Brewery is home to practitioners of artistic media that include painting, sculpture, photography, music, industrial design, architecture and experimental new media. More than 100 of the studios are open to the public during the twice-yearly Brewery Art Walk.

History
The Brewery Arts Complex began in 1903 as the Edison Electric Steam Power Plant and then as a Pabst Blue Ribbon brewery. It was converted into artist lofts beginning in 1982.

Location 

2100 North Main Street, east of Chinatown in the Lincoln Heights area of Los Angeles, California

References

External links

American artist groups and collectives
Art in Greater Los Angeles
Lincoln Heights, Los Angeles
Buildings and structures in Los Angeles
1900s architecture in the United States
Tourist attractions in Los Angeles
Adaptive reuse of industrial structures in Greater Los Angeles